Kirk Herman Schulz (born May 11, 1963) is an American educator, currently serving as the 11th president of Washington State University, a position he began on June 13, 2016. Prior to serving at Washington State, Schulz was the 13th president of Kansas State University.

Biography
Schulz was born in Portsmouth, Virginia, but raised in Norfolk, Virginia. He graduated in 1981 from Norfolk Christian High School. Schulz attended Old Dominion University for three years before transferring to Virginia Tech in 1984. He received his Bachelor of Science in chemical engineering from Virginia Tech in 1986 and his doctorate in 1991. Schulz first worked as an assistant professor of chemical engineering at the University of North Dakota. In 1995, he became assistant professor of chemical engineering at Michigan Tech and promoted to associate professor in 1998. Schulz also became chair of the Department of Chemical Engineering there in the same year.

He accepted a position at Mississippi State University in 2001, becoming director of the Dave C. Swalm School of Chemical Engineering, where he held the Earnest W. Deavenport Jr. endowed chair. Schulz became Dean of Engineering of the James Worth Bagley College of Engineering and the first Earnest W. and Mary Ann Deavenport Jr. endowed chair in 2005. Two years later, Schulz was Interim Vice President for Research and Economic Development, a position which became permanent for him later in the year.

On February 11, 2009, the Kansas Board of Regents announced that Schulz was selected as the thirteenth president of Kansas State University. On March 25, 2016, the Washington State University Board of Regents announced that Schulz was selected as the 11th president of Washington State University, which he began in June 2016.

Personal life
Schulz is married to Noel Schulz, who was the associate dean for research and graduate programs in the Kansas State University College of Engineering and the Paslay professor of electrical and computer engineering. They have two sons, Tim and Andrew.

Professional affiliations
Schulz is a member of the ABET Engineering Accreditation Commission (EAC) and an active member of AIChE, ASEE, and ABET. He was named a Fellow of the American Association for the Advancement of Science (AAAS) in 2007 and a Fellow of the American Society for Engineering Education (ASEE) in 2008.

References

External links
 Washington State University – profile

1963 births
Living people
Presidents of Washington State University
Presidents of Kansas State University
Virginia Tech alumni
Mississippi State University faculty
Fellows of the American Society for Engineering Education
Fellows of the American Association for the Advancement of Science